Bellicourt is a commune in the department of Aisne in Hauts-de-France in northern France. It lies on the N44 road between Cambrai and Saint-Quentin and over the principal tunnel of the St. Quentin Canal. It was the site of numerous intense combat actions and battles during World War I.

Population

See also
 Communes of the Aisne department

References

Communes of Aisne
Aisne communes articles needing translation from French Wikipedia